This is a list of notable events in country music that took place in the year 1945.

Events
August 4 – The Billboard's American Folk Tunes column reported that Gene Autry had signed a long-term recording  contract with Columbia Records. The source of the information was Art Satherly, described as  "the grand old man of Western music". Art moved over to Columbia Records when CBS purchased American Record Corporation (ARC) in December 1938, and currently manages and produces Okeh Record's stable of artists, which includes Autry, Bob Wills, Ted Daffan, Johnny Bond, Al Dexter, Wiley Walker and Gene Sullivan, Spade Cooley, Roy Acuff and Fred Rose. Columbia is in the process of phasing out the Okeh label, and future releases will be on the parent label.

Top hits of the year

Number one hits
(As certified by Billboard magazine)

Top Hillbilly (Country) Recordings 1945

"Shame On You" by Spade Cooley was easily the number one record with 292 points. Despite 11 weeks at no. 1, "You Two Timed Me One Time Too Often" finished second with 240 points, because "Shame On You" had 33 top ten weeks, to only 21 for the latter. "Sioux City Sue" had 30 top ten weeks, but only 4 at no. 1.

1945's year-end list of The Billboard's "Most Played Juke Box Folk Records" represented the first Country music (referred to at the time as "Hillbilly") chart in the lineage of today's "Hot Country Songs". Note that it was based on weekly reports supplied by a sampling of Juke Box operators nationwide; Billboard would not add Country Sales and Air Play charts until 1948 and 1950, respectively. Each week, a score of 15 points was assigned for the no. 1 record, 9 points for no. 2, 8 points for no. 3, and so on, and the total of all weeks determined the final rank. Records that entered the chart in December 1944, or remained on the chart after December 1945 received points for their full chart runs. Appearances on other Billboard charts had no effect on ranking, but are listed for reference. Additional information can be found at List of Most Played Juke Box Folk Records number ones of 1945.

Births 
 January 16 — Ronnie Milsap, blind, blue-eyed soul-styled singer who became one of country music's most popular entertainers of the 1970s and 1980s.
 March 14 — Michael Martin Murphey, Western-styled singer-songwriter who enjoyed mainstream success in the 1980s as a country-pop performer.
 May 23 – Misty Morgan, singer-songwriter who, with husband Jack Blanchard, had a string of animal-themed hit recordings in the 1970s.
 June 5 — Don Reid, lead singer and main songwriter of The Statler Brothers.
 June 20 — Anne Murray, Canadian vocalist who became one of that country's most successful country music performers during the 1970s and 1980s.

Further reading 
 Kingsbury, Paul, "Vinyl Hayride: Country Music Album Covers 1947–1989," Country Music Foundation, 2003
 Millard, Bob, "Country Music: 70 Years of America's Favorite Music," HarperCollins, New York, 1993
 Whitburn, Joel. "Top Country Songs 1944–2005 – 6th Edition." 2005.

References

Country
Country music by year